The Road Home is a cover album by Jordan Rudess. It was released on September 12, 2007.

Rudess's arrangements of these classic prog tracks include many sections that were not in the original songs, especially solos. Track 5 is the only original piece.

Track listing
 "Dance on a Volcano" – 8:44 (Genesis tribute, from the A Trick of the Tail album, 1976)
 "Sound Chaser" – 12:54 (Yes tribute, from the Relayer album, 1974)
 "Just the Same" – 8:22 (Gentle Giant tribute, from the Free Hand album, 1975)
 "JR Piano Medley" – 8:22
 "Soon" (Yes, from Relayer, 1974)
 "Supper's Ready" (Genesis, from Foxtrot, 1972)
 "I Talk to the Wind" (King Crimson, from In the Court of the Crimson King, 1969)
 "And You and I" (Yes, from Close to the Edge, 1972)
"Piece of the π" – 3:05
"Tarkus" – 22:47 (Emerson, Lake & Palmer tribute, from the Tarkus album, 1971)
 "Eruption" (Emerson)
 "Stones of Years" (Emerson, Lake)
 "Iconoclast" (Emerson)
 "Mass" (Emerson, Lake)
 "Manticore" (Emerson)
 "Battlefield" (Lake)
 "Aquatarkus" (Emerson)

Personnel
 Jordan Rudess – keyboards, continuum, vocals on "I Talk to the Wind"
 Rod Morgenstein – drums
 Neal Morse – Vocals on track 1
 Kip Winger – Vocals on track 3 and 6 (Mass and Battlefield)
 Steven Wilson – vocals on track 6 (Stones of Years)
 Ed Wynne – First guitar solo on track 2, second guitar solo on track 3.
 Bumblefoot – First guitar solo on track 3, guitar on track 6 (Aquatarkus)
 Marco Sfogli – Guitar on Track 1. 
 Nick D'Virgilio – Vocals on track 2.
 Ricky Garcia – Second guitar solo on track 2. Guitar on track 6 (Stones of Years and Battlefield)
 Bert Baldwin – Vocals on "I Talk to the Wind"
 Derek Riggs – Art work

External links
 The Road Home at Magna Carta
 The Road Home at Allmusic
 What other musicians are saying about The Road Home

2007 albums
Covers albums
Jordan Rudess albums